G.E. Harvey (1889 - 1965) was a British diplomat, historian and professor, specializing in Burmese history. Harvey obtained a bachelor of literature degree from University of Oxford in 1922. His undergraduate thesis was published by Longman's in 1925. He is best known for his seminal books on Burmese history, including History of Burma, which was published in 1925 and known for its Burmese chronicle perspective.

Harvey became a lecturer in Burmese history and law at the University of Oxford from 1936 to 1942. He was president of the Oxford University Anthropological Society in the 1940s. After World War II, he retired in Oxford, and died in 1965.

Publications 

 "The Writing of Burmese History" in Journal of the Burma Research Society
 Outline of Burmese History (1924)
 History of Burma (1925)
 British Rule in Burma, 1824-1942 (1946)

References 

British writers
British historians
British diplomats
20th-century Burmese historians
Academic staff of the University of Yangon
Academics of the University of Oxford
Alumni of the University of Oxford
1889 births
1965 deaths
Historians of Southeast Asia
Burmese studies scholars